Aleksandar Dimitrov Kostov (2 March 1938 – 15 April 2019) also known as Sasho, was a Bulgarian footballer and later coach.

He represented Bulgaria at the FIFA World Cups in 1962 and 1966.

Honours

Player
Levski Sofia
 Bulgarian League (3): 1964–65, 1967–68, 1969–70
 Bulgarian Cup (6): 1956, 1957, 1959, 1967, 1970, 1971

Manager
AS Marsa
 Tunisian Cup: 1989–90

References

External links
Profile at levskisofia.info

1938 births
2019 deaths
Footballers from Sofia
Bulgarian footballers
Bulgaria international footballers
PFC Levski Sofia players
Botev Plovdiv players
First Professional Football League (Bulgaria) players
1962 FIFA World Cup players
1966 FIFA World Cup players
Association football forwards
Bulgarian football managers
Alki Larnaca FC managers
Ethnikos Achna FC managers
AS Marsa managers
FC Montana managers
Persebaya Surabaya managers
Bulgarian expatriate football managers
Expatriate football managers in Cyprus
Bulgarian expatriate sportspeople in Cyprus
Expatriate football managers in Tunisia
Bulgarian expatriate sportspeople in Tunisia
Expatriate football managers in Indonesia
Bulgarian expatriate sportspeople in Indonesia